Pansino is an Italian surname. Notable people with the surname include:

Rosanna Pansino (born 1985), American baker, actress, and YouTube personality
Salvatore Pansino (born 1934), American electrical engineer

Italian-language surnames